The 2016 Spanish General State Budget was the state budget for the Kingdom of Spain for the year 2016.

Structure

Income

Expenditure

References

See also
 General State Budget

2016 government budgets
2016 in Spain
Politics of Spain